Lockett James Pundt IV (born October 7, 1982) is an American musician, guitarist and multi-instrumentalist of Atlanta-based indie rock group Deerhunter.  Pundt joined Deerhunter in 2005 as a guitarist. He releases solo material under the name Lotus Plaza. His debut album as Lotus Plaza, The Floodlight Collective, was released March 23, 2009 on CD and vinyl.  Pundt has cited his greatest musical influences as being Stereolab, My Bloody Valentine, and Roxy Music, "on a subliminal level."

Musical career
Pundt met Deerhunter vocalist Bradford Cox while the two were in high school.  "I was summoned by this girl who was in a drama class of mine named Lauren. She told me that Brad wanted to meet me more or less... It was arranged to go down in the bus ports between class... And so we met in the bus port."  In an interview with Pitchfork Media, Cox discussed the sensations he felt meeting Pundt for the first time: "I was attracted to him, but not in some kind of like, just physical way. I was attracted to his melancholy, his sitting alone, staring at the ground… I immediately fell in love right then at first sight."  The two played together in a three-piece band known as The Floodlight Collective.  "It wasn’t anything serious really, just sort of jam on stuff and have fun…It was one of the first musical experiences that I shared with other people."  The band later inspired the name of Pundt's first album as Lotus Plaza. In 2005, Pundt joined Deerhunter as a guitarist; the first album he helped produce with the band was 2007's Cryptograms. Since joining Deerhunter Pundt has contributed songwriting/lead vocals on at least one song on all of their subsequent albums. Pundt's first album as Lotus Plaza, The Floodlight Collective, was released on March 23, 2009 to mixed critical reception. Spooky Action at a Distance is Lotus Plaza's second record. It was released on April 2, 2012. The current Lotus Plaza touring lineup is as follows:  T.J. Blake on bass, Frankie Broyles on drums, Allen Taylor on synth/electronics, Dan Wakefield on guitar, and Pundt on both lead vocals and guitar. Pundt also has a side-project with his wife, Shayda Yavari, called Nice Weekend. They have released one track as part of an Audraglint split 10, called 'Come Back'.

Discography
With Deerhunter:
 2007 Cryptograms/Fluorescent Grey EP
 2008 Microcastle/Weird Era Cont. 2009 Rainwater Cassette Exchange EP
 2010 Halcyon Digest 2013 Monomania 2015 Fading Frontier 2019 Why Hasn't Everything Already Disappeared?As Lotus Plaza:
 2009 The Floodlight Collective 2012 Spooky Action at a Distance 2014 Overnight Motorcycle Music EP''

See also 
List of ambient music artists

References

Living people
1982 births
Musical groups established in 2005
American rock musicians
Shoegaze musicians
Ambient musicians
American indie rock musicians
Musicians from Marietta, Georgia
Deerhunter members